The 2012 Tour de Langkawi was the 17th edition of the Tour de Langkawi, a cycling stage race that took place in Malaysia. It began on 24 February in Putrajaya and ended on 4 March in Kuala Terengganu which carried the slogan "Ready for the World". The race was sanctioned by the Union Cycliste Internationale (UCI) as a 2.HC (hors category) race on the 2011–12 UCI Asia Tour calendar.

The race was won for the second time by Colombia's José Serpa, after taking the lead of the race with his second consecutive stage win on the sixth stage, and held the lead until the end of the race. Serpa's winning margin over his  team-mate José Rujano was 30 seconds, and the podium was completed by Víctor Niño of the Azad University Cross Team, 33 seconds behind Rujano and 63 in arrears of Serpa. In the race's other classifications, Serpa also finished at the top of the mountains classification, 's Andrea Guardini won the points classification, after taking a record-breaking six stage victories, and  finished over twelve minutes clear of their nearest rivals in the teams classification.  and their rider Alexsandr Dyachenko finished at the head of their respective Asian sub-classifications.

Teams
22 teams accepted invitations to participate in the 2012 Tour de Langkawi. Two UCI ProTeams were invited to the race, along with seven UCI Professional Continental and ten UCI Continental teams. The field was completed by three national selection teams.

UCI ProTour teams

UCI Professional Continental teams

UCI Continental teams

Aisan Racing Team

Max Success Sports
OCBC Singapore Continental Cycling Team

Seoul Cycling Team

National teams

Indonesia
Malaysia
New Zealand

Stages

The race comprises 10 stages, covering 1413.4 kilometres.

Classification leadership

Final standings

General classification

Points classification

Mountains classification

Asian rider classification

Team classification

Asian team classification

Stage results

Stage 1
24 February 2012 — Putrajaya, Individual time trial

Stage 2
25 February 2012 — Putrajaya to Melaka,

Stage 3
26 February 2012 — Melaka to Parit Sulong,

Stage 4
27 February 2012 — Batu Pahat to Muar,

Stage 5
28 February 2012 — Ayer Keroh to Pandan Indah,

Stage 6 
29 February 2012 — Proton, Shah Alam to Genting Highlands,

Stage 7
1 March 2012 — Bentong to Kuantan,

Stage 8 
2 March 2012 — Pekan to Chukai,

Stage 9
3 March 2012 — Kemasik to Kuala Terengganu,

Stage 10 
4 March 2012 — Kenyir Lake to Kuala Terengganu, Criterium

References

External links

2012
2012 in road cycling
2012 in Malaysian sport